The UN Commission on Life-Saving Commodities for Women and Children (UNCoLSC) was set up as part of the United Nations Secretary-General's Every Woman, Every Child programme. It is premised on the projection that a strong worldwide intervention has the power to save over 6 million lives by 2015 through increasing access to, and appropriate use of, 13 lifesaving commodities that are underutilized during pregnancy, childbirth, and early childhood (especially under-five years). The UNCoLSC therefore works to make these thirteen life-saving commodities more widely available and used in low-income nations to forestall preventable maternal and children deaths.

These thirteen commodities are below with the common barriers or medical conditions that they prevent or help in parentheses:

 Oxytocin - (postpartum haemorrhage)
 Misoprostol - (postpartum haemorrhage)
 Magnesium sulfate - (eclampsia and severe pre-eclampsia)
 Injectable antibiotics - (newborn sepsis)
 Antenatal corticosteroids (ANCs) - (preterm respiratory distress syndrome)
 Chlorhexidine - (newborn cord care)
 Resuscitation devices - (newborn asphyxia)
 Amoxicillin - (pneumonia)
 Oral rehydration salts (ORS) - (diarrhoea)
 Zinc - (diarrhoea)
 Female condoms - (family planning and contraception)
 Contraceptive implants - (family planning and contraception)
 Emergency contraception (family planning and contraception)

References

See also
 Female Condom - Awareness and Access

United Nations Secretariat
Organizations established by the United Nations